Nehir Erdoğan (born 16 June 1980) is a Turkish actress. She became famous in Yabancı Damat, the first Turkish TV series sold to channels of Greece. She later played in other hit movies and series. 

With Engin Altan Düzyatan, she played in crime series "Son" and youth series "Koçum Benim". "Son" was sold to USA, France, Spain, Russian, Netherlands for adaptation. 

She played girl disgused as man in "Hababam Sınıfı Merhaba" which sequel of franchise youth film series. She played in youth thriller film "Okul".

With Berk Oktay, she played in romantic comedy "Tatlı Bela Fadime". With İbrahim Çelikkol, she played in crime series "Reaksiyon". She had guest role in popular series "Fi".

She married in 2014 and divorced in 2016.

Filmography

References 

 Muzikvesoz.com - Biography of Nehir Erdoğan

External links 

1980 births
Actresses from İzmir
Living people
Turkish film actresses
Turkish television actresses
20th-century Turkish actresses